The 1986 Hofmeister World Doubles was the fifth staging of the doubles snooker tournament. It was played at the Derngate in Northampton and held between 2 and 14 December 1986 with the tournament televised on ITV.

Steve Davis and Tony Meo went on to win their fourth title in five years by beating Mike Hallett and 17 year old Stephen Hendry 12–3 in the final, after leading 11–2 before the last . The highest break of the tournament, calculated as the highest combined break made by playing partners in a single match, was 217 by Davis and Meo.

The winners received £50,000 prize money between them.

Results
Results from the last 16 onwards are shown below. Winning players are denoted in bold.

Selected earlier results

First two rounds played at Romiley Forum, Stockport 12–16 October 1986 

Round 1

Round 2

Round 3

Northampton 2–4 December

References

World Doubles Championship
World Doubles Championship
World Doubles Championship
World Doubles Championship